Palau–Spain relations are the bilateral and diplomatic relations between these two countries. Palau currently has no diplomatic or consular representation in Spain. However, Spain has a consulate in Koror, while the embassy representing Spain for Palau is in Manila, Philippines.

Historical relations 
It is believed that the first European explorer to see the islands was the Spanish Gonzalo Gómez de Espinosa in 1522, aboard the ship Trinidad , during the Magellan-Elcano expedition. Later, it would be visited by Ruy López de Villalobos in 1543.

After the conquest of the Philippines in 1565 by the Spanish Empire, the Palau archipelago belonged to the General Captaincy of the Philippines, created in 1574, as part of the Spanish East Indies.

However, the Spanish presence only began to express itself with evangelization, initiated at the end of 17th century, and its dominance began to be delineated in 18th century.

The first encounters were with whalers and merchants, who used the islands as stopovers in their travels. From those first contacts, but especially in the 19th century, diseases brought on ships from Europe decimated the population of the island, in particular smallpox, flu and leprosy, the same as the use of firearms to resolve tribal differences. It is estimated that the indigenous population went from 50,000 inhabitants before coming into contact with Europeans, to a total not exceeding 3,700 at the beginning of 20th century.

Diplomatic relations 
Palau established diplomatic relations with Spain on 3 August 1995. In December 2012, the President of the Government sent a letter of condolences to President Remengesau Jr for the victims and the disastrous effects of typhoon Bopha. In November 2013, the King of Spain sent a letter of condolences to President Remengesau for the substantial material damage suffered by Typhoon Haiyan.

At the end of 2014, Palau decriminalized homosexual relations after the mediation of Spain and other countries.

Cooperation 
At the end of 2006, Spain awarded a grant of 200,000 euros to the Government of the Republic of Palau, through its Ministry of State, for the implementation of the project "Conservation and sustainable use of marine and coastal biodiversity of Palau". In the month of March 2009 this project was completed. On the occasion of the Zaragoza Expo of 2008 and after various contacts, Palau agreed to integrate into the Pacific Pavilion that won the first Pavilion prize. Similarly, Spain invited the Palau authorities to attend the Palau National Day at the Expo.

Also in 2008, Spain contributed €3.4 million to a project to improve computer networks and to create a consortium of universities that promote knowledge sharing in the region of the Group of Small Island States on track of development- Small Island Developing States (SIDS) -, of which Palau is a member in 2011, Spain provided funding of 30,000 euros to the Ministry of Education of Palau for the organization of the meeting in November of that year in Koror of Directors of Education of the Member States of the Forum of the Islands of the Pacific for the development of a regional education framework.

In the year 2013 they have been granted within the framework of the Program for Cultural Cooperation for the Philippines and the Pacific (SPCC), an aid worth 100,000.00 Philippine pesos (€1,887.51) for the celebration of the " 2nd Annual Conference Dilmlengui Women Group ". In view of the 45th Summit of the Pacific Islands Forum, Spain has decided to support the organization with 20,000 euros, as it did in previous years at that summit.

See also  
 Foreign relations of Palau 
 Foreign relations of Spain

References 

 
Spain
Palau